Berkeley Square Historic District  is a national historic district located in Saranac Lake (Harrietstown) in Franklin County, New York.  It consists of 22 contributing buildings; the 1926-28 Harrietstown Town Hall and 21 commercial buildings constructed between 1867 and 1932.  Most of the buildings are three stories with cornices.  Styles range from a group of three Second Empire style structures dated to the late-1860s-early 1870s, late 19th century business blocks, and early 20th century buildings reflecting the various revival styles of that period.  The Harrietstown Town Hall is a flat roofed building with parapet and features a domed cylindrical tower.

It was listed on the National Register of Historic Places in 1988.

References

External links
Historic Saranac Lake: Berkeley Square Historic District

Historic districts on the National Register of Historic Places in New York (state)
Commercial buildings on the National Register of Historic Places in New York (state)
Second Empire architecture in New York (state)
Historic districts in Franklin County, New York
National Register of Historic Places in Franklin County, New York